The Committee on Science, Space, and Technology is a committee of the United States House of Representatives. It has jurisdiction over non-defense federal scientific research and development. More specifically, the committee has complete jurisdiction over the following federal agencies: NASA, NSF, NIST, and the OSTP. The committee also has authority over R&D activities at the Department of Energy, the EPA, FAA, NOAA, the DOT, the NWS, the DHS and the U.S. Fire Administration.

History 
In the wake of the Soviet Sputnik program in the late 1950s, Congress created the Select Committee on Astronautics and Space Exploration in 1958, chaired by majority leader John William McCormack. This select committee drafted the National Aeronautics and Space Act that created the National Aeronautics and Space Administration (NASA). A staff report of the committee, the Space Handbook: Astronautics and its Applications, provided non-technical information about spaceflight to U.S. policy makers.

The committee also chartered the permanent House Committee on Science and Astronautics, which officially began on January 3, 1959, and was the first new standing committee established in the House since 1946. The name was changed in 1974 to the House Committee on Science and Technology. The name was changed again in 1987 to the House Committee on Science, Space and Technology. After the Republican Party gained a majority in Congress in 1994, the name of the committee was changed to the House Committee on Science. With the return of control to the Democrats in 2007, the committee's name was changed back to the House Committee on Science and Technology.

During the 112th Congress, which was in session from 2011-2013, Committee Chairman Ralph Hall added "Space" back into the committee's name: "The Committee on Science, Space, and Technology" – a nod to the committee's history, broad jurisdiction, and the importance of space exploration in maintaining American innovation and competitiveness.

Members, 118th Congress 

Resolutions electing members:  (Chair),  (Ranking Member),  (R),  (D),  (D),  (R),  (D)

Subcommittees

Committee chairs, 1959–present 
Chairmen since 1959
 Overton Brooks (LA), 1959–1961
 George P. Miller (CA), 1961–1973
 Olin E. Teague (TX), 1973–1978
 Don Fuqua (FL), 1979–1987
 Robert A. Roe (NJ), 1987–1991
 George Brown, Jr. (CA), 1991–1995
 Robert Smith Walker (PA), 1995–1997
 Jim Sensenbrenner (WI), 1997–2001
 Sherwood Boehlert (NY), 2001–2007
 Bart Gordon (TN), 2007–2011
 Ralph Hall (TX), 2011–2013
 Lamar S. Smith (TX), 2013–2019
 Eddie Bernice Johnson (TX), 2019–2023
 Frank Lucas (OK), 2023–present

Historical membership rosters

117th Congress

Resolutions electing members:  (Chair),  (Ranking Member),  (D),  (R),  (D),  (D),  (R),  (R)

Subcommittees

116th Congress

Sources:  (Chair),  (Ranking Member),  (D),  (R),  (D),  (R),  (R),  (R),  (D),  (R)

Subcommittees
There were five subcommittees in the 116th Congress.

115th Congress

See also 
 List of current United States House of Representatives committees

References

External links 

 Official web site (Archive)
 House Science, Space, and Technology Committee. Legislation activity and reports, Congress.gov.
 Republican Science Committee website
 
 

Science
Science and technology in the United States
Space policy of the United States
NASA oversight
Politics of science
1958 establishments in Washington, D.C.
Organizations established in 1958